The 1970–71 NCAA University Division men's ice hockey season began in November 1970 and concluded with the 1971 NCAA University Division Men's Ice Hockey Tournament's championship game on March 20, 1971 at the Onondaga War Memorial in Syracuse, New York. This was the 24th season in which an NCAA ice hockey championship was held and is the 77th year overall where an NCAA school fielded a team.

Saint Louis begins to sponsor their ice hockey program as an independent.

Regular season

Season tournaments

Standings

1971 NCAA Tournament

Note: * denotes overtime period(s)

Player stats

Scoring leaders
The following players led the league in points at the conclusion of the season.

GP = Games played; G = Goals; A = Assists; Pts = Points; PIM = Penalty minutes

Leading goaltenders
The following goaltenders led the league in goals against average at the end of the regular season while playing at least 33% of their team's total minutes.

GP = Games played; Min = Minutes played; W = Wins; L = Losses; OT = Overtime/shootout losses; GA = Goals against; SO = Shutouts; SV% = Save percentage; GAA = Goals against average

Awards

NCAA

ECAC

WCHA

See also
 1970–71 NCAA College Division men's ice hockey season

References

External links
College Hockey Historical Archives
1970–71 NCAA Standings

 
NCAA